The Jewel is a 1933 British crime film directed by Reginald Denham, produced by Hugh Perceval, and starring Hugh Williams, Frances Drake and Jack Hawkins. The film is based on an Edgar Wallace novel The Strange Countess.

Plot summary
A family heirloom is stolen and the family attempts to recover it.

Cast
 Hugh Williams as Frank Hallam
 Frances Drake as Jenny Day / Lady Joan
 Jack Hawkins as Peter Roberts
 Lilian Oldland as Lady Maude Carleigh
 Eric Cowley as Major Brook
 Geoffrey Goodheart as Mr. Day
 Annie Esmond as Mme. Vanheim
 Clare Harris as Mrs. Day

References

External links

1933 films
1933 crime films
British crime films
Films based on works by Edgar Wallace
Films directed by Reginald Denham
Paramount Pictures films
British black-and-white films
1930s English-language films
1930s British films